Karpoorada Gombe is a 1996 Indian Kannada language romantic drama film directed and written by S. Mahendar. The film stars Ramesh Aravind, Shruti and Shwetha in the lead roles and featured music composed by Hamsalekha. Actor Sharan made his debut with this film. The film was dubbed and released in Tamil as Akka by RB Choudary with added comedy track of Vadivelu and Chinni Jayanth. The film was remade in Telugu as Seetakka with Vinod Kumar and Aamani.

Cast

Soundtrack
All the songs are composed, scored and lyrics written by Hamsalekha.

References

External links 
 

1996 films
1990s Kannada-language films
Indian romantic drama films
Films scored by Hamsalekha
1996 romantic drama films
Films directed by S. Mahendar

Kannada films remade in other languages